State Route 139 (SR 139) is a  state highway traveling from U.S. Route 2 (US 2) and US 201 in Norridgewock at its western terminus to US 1A in Winterport at its eastern terminus.

Route description
SR 139 begins at an intersection with U.S. Route 201A, U.S. Route 2, and SR 8 in Norridgewock. The intersection of SR 139 and U.S. Route 2 is notorious for being one of the most dangerous intersections in central Maine. SR 139 then heads south and joins SR 104 for a 2.78 mile concurrency, during which it intersects with SR 23, followed by an interchange with Interstate 95. The section of SR 139 between U.S. Route 2 in Norridgewock and Interstate 95 in Fairfield is often used as a bypass of U.S Route 2 through Skowhegan. From the interchange with Interstate 95, as it heads east there is a 0.22 concurrency with U.S. Route 201 in Fairfield and then a 2.23 mile concurrency with SR 11 and SR 100 in Benton. SR 139 continues on to have a 0.18 mile concurrency with U.S. Route 202 and SR 9 before once more being without concurrent routes for 0.69 miles in Unity and then begins a 3.5 mile concurrency with SR 220 in Thorndike. SR 139 intersects SR 203 at its northern terminus and then SR 7 as it continues through Brooks. It then continues into Monroe, where it intersects SR 141 at SR 141's northern terminus. From there, SR 139 has a 1.67 mile concurrency with SR 69 and reaches its western terminus at US Route 1A in Winterport.

Major junctions

References

External links

Floodgap Roadgap's RoadsAroundME: Maine State Route 139

139
Transportation in Somerset County, Maine
Transportation in Kennebec County, Maine
Transportation in Waldo County, Maine